Kevin Joseph (born August 1, 1976) is an American former professional baseball pitcher who last played professional baseball in 2003. Joseph attended Rice University, which has had many alumni become Major Leaguers.

Career
In 1997, he was drafted by the San Francisco Giants in the 6th round (178th overall). He started his professional career that same year in A-ball. Over the years, he found his niche as a relief pitcher, posting minor league ERAs as low as 1.42 and 1.77.

By the time he made his Major League debut at age 25 in 2002 with the St. Louis Cardinals (the Giants traded him earlier that year for Jason Christiansen), he was already a veteran minor leaguer. He had a very small chance to prove he was major league worthy, only appearing in 11 games that year. Joseph was quickly sent to the minors, where he spent one more season. In his final season, he made two stops in the minors, each winning only one game with each team.

References

External links

Kevin's page at baseball-almanac.com

1976 births
Living people
American expatriate baseball players in Canada
Baseball players from Pennsylvania
Bakersfield Blaze players
Edmonton Trappers players
Fresno Grizzlies players
Major League Baseball pitchers
Memphis Redbirds players
People from Camp Hill, Pennsylvania
Rice Owls baseball players
Salem-Keizer Volcanoes players
San Jose Giants players
Shreveport Captains players
Shreveport Swamp Dragons players
St. Louis Cardinals players